Giuseppe Pella (18 April 1902 – 31 May 1981) was an Italian Christian Democratic politician who served as the 31st prime minister of Italy from 1953 to 1954. He was also Minister of Treasury, Budget and of Foreign Affairs during the 1950s and early 1960s. Pella served as President of the European Parliament from 1954 to 1956 after the death of Alcide De Gasperi.

Pella is widely considered one of the most important politicians in Italy's post-war history. His liberist economic and monetary policies strongly influenced the Italian reconstruction and the subsequent economic miracle.

Early life and career
Giuseppe Pella was born in Valdengo, Piedmont. He was the second son of Luigi Pella and Viglielmina Bona, sharecroppers in a small farm. After having obtained his elementary school certificate privately, he attended the three-year period of technical schools in Biella and then an accounting Institute in Turin. After graduating in Economy and Commerce at the Royal Superior Institute of Turin in 1924, he became a professor of accounting at the Sapienza University of Rome and University of Turin. He also started working as tax advisor and auditor.

Under the regime of Benito Mussolini, Pella was forced to join the National Fascist Party (PNF), to continue his occupation as tax advisor and professor. As a fascist, he was appointed member of the Governing Council of the Fascist Culture Provincial Institute of Biella and consultant of the municipality of Biella. In the late 1930s he was appointment deputy podestà of Biella, with the task of reorganizing city's financial system.

In 1934, Pella married Ines Maria Cardolle, from whom he had a daughter, Wanda, born in 1938.

During the Italian Civil War, Pella started cooperating with the National Liberation Committee (CLN), a political umbrella organization and the main representative of the Italian resistance movement fighting against the German occupation of Italy in the aftermath of the armistice of Cassibile. After the end of the World War II, he joined the Christian Democracy (DC), led by Alcide De Gasperi, becoming one of the main members of the party's right wing. After the 1946 general election, he became a member of the Constituent Assembly of Italy. In July 1946, he was appointed under-secretary of Finances in the second and third governments of De Gasperi. On 6 June 1947, De Gasperi appointed him Minister of Finance in his fourth cabinet.

Minister of Treasury and Budget
From May 1948 until January 1954 Pella served as Minister of Budget under the premiership of Alcide De Gasperi. Moreover, from May 1948 until July 1951 and again from February 1952 to August 1953, he also served as Minister of Treasury. As minister he implemented liberist and monetarist policies, characterized by a strong laissez-faire capitalism, which gained him the enmity of the Italian Communist Party (PCI) and Italian Socialist Party (PSI), as well as harsh criticism from members of Christian Democracy's left-wing, like Giuseppe Dossetti and Giorgio La Pira. The American experts of the Marshall Plan, who arrived in Rome to check the use of Plan's funds, were disconcerted that not a dollar had been spent on a Roosevelt-like public spending policy: the funds had in fact been used exclusively to bring order to the public finance and to stabilize the state budget following the thought of Luigi Einaudi.

Prime Minister of Italy

The 1953 general election was characterised by changes in the electoral law. Even if the general structure remained uncorrupted, the government introduced a superbonus of two thirds of seats in the House for the coalition which would obtain at-large the absolute majority of votes. The change was strongly opposed by the opposition parties as well as DC's smaller coalition partners, who had no realistic chance of success under this system. The new law was called the Scam Law by its detractors, including some dissidents of minor government parties who founded special opposition groups to deny the artificial landslide to Christian Democracy.

In the 7 June election, the government coalition won 49.9% of national vote, just a few thousand votes of the threshold for a supermajority, resulting in an ordinary proportional distribution of the seats. Technically, the government won the election, winning a clear working majority of seats in both houses, but frustration with the failure to win a supermajority caused significant tensions in the leading coalition, which ended on 2 August, when De Gasperi was forced to resign by the Parliament. On 17 August, President Einaudi appointed Pella as new Prime Minister. Pella Cabinet was immediately labeled as "administrative government", with the only aim of approving the budget law. As premier, he also served as ad interim Minister of Budget and Foreign Affairs.

Pella gained further critics when, by issuing nationalistic declarations, he created strife with Josip Broz Tito regarding the Free Territory of Trieste. The Yugoslav dictator declared he would have invaded Trieste if the Americans had assigned it to Italy. Then, Pella threatened to send troops to the Eastern border in response to Tito's provocation. The crisis that could result in a military confrontation was brought back after many diplomatic efforts by the Western powers. His interventionism provoked opposite reactions in Parliament and in the press: Monarchist National Party (PNM) and the neo-fascist Italian Social Movement (MSI) strongly supported him, while the leftist parties, and especially the communists, accused him of nationalism and anti-communism. Much of his own party remained neutral, partly because the governments of United States and United Kingdom wanted to keep good relations with Yugoslavia even at the cost of penalizing Italy. The media, however, described Pella as a patriot and as a courageous statesman. Much of the public opinion appreciated his policies.

On 12 January 1954, after only 5 months in power, a strong confrontation with many members of DC, regarding the appointment of Salvatore Aldisio as new Minister of Agriculture, forced Pella to resign.

After the premiership

After the end of his government, in November 1954, Pella was elected President of the Common Assembly, the plenary assembly of European Coal and Steel Community (ECSC), which had been considered as the prototype of the European Parliament. He hold the office until November 1956. His pro-European vision was clearly outlined already in the inauguration speech as president, where he sustained the need to create a Europe "inspired by the concept of supernationality, built not against nations but with the sincere collaboration of nations." Few years later, discussing about his years at the head of the European institution, he stated that he always held his office "with the determination to pursue the strategic plan of a progressive transfer of sovereignty from the member States to the European institutions."

In 1954, he founded, along with Giulio Andreotti, a right-wing faction of Christian Democracy, known as "Concentration". In 1955 he was one of the kingmakers of Giovanni Gronchi's election to the Presidency of the Republic, against Cesare Merzagora, who was the candidate proposed by the Christian Democratic secretary, Amintore Fanfani. Pella and Andreotti's move gained the surprising support of communist and socialist parties, as well as the one monarchist and neo-fascist movements. After Gronchi's sworn in, Pella was considered the natural candidate for the premiership, however the new President of the Republic appointed Antonio Segni.

In May 1957, Pella served as Minister of Foreign Affairs in the government of Adone Zoli, of whom he served also as Deputy Prime Minister. He became Foreign Affairs Minister again under Segni, from February 1959 until March 1960, and Minister of Budget in Fanfani III Cabinet from July 1960 to February 1962.

A strong opponent of Fanfani's alliance with the Socialist Party, from 1962 he decided to keep aside. In the later years, he became president of the Senate Foreign Affairs Committee from 18 July 1968 to 23 February 1972 and briefly returned to the government as Finance Minister in the first government of Giulio Andreotti from February to June 1972, which however failed to gain confidence by the Parliament.

After leaving politics in 1976, he continued his role of President of "National Association of Insurance Institutes" and of the "Association of Tax Advisors and Accountants". He also led "Piemonte Italia", a promotional institute of studies on the regional economy, which he founded in the 1960s.

Pella died on 31 May 1981 in Rome, at the age of 79.

Electoral history

Notes

Further reading
 
 Ivone, D. "Giuseppe Pella e la politica liberista nella ricostruzione economica del secondo Dopoguerra". Rivista internazionale di storia della banca (1982): vol 24-25 pp 104–20.
 
 Marcucci, Gabriella Fanello. Giuseppe Pella un liberista cristiano (Soveria Mannelli, Rubbettino Editore, 2007), 427 pp.,    online review
 Pella, Giuseppe. "Resume de l'allocution de M. le Professeur Giuseppe Pella, Ministro del Bilancio. Conference consultative sur les aspects sociaux de la politique agricole commune. Rome, 28 septembre 1961= Summary of speech by Professor Giuseppe Pella, Minister for Budget. Consultative conference on the social aspects of the common agriculture policy. Rome, 28 September 1961". (1961). online in French

External links
 

|-

|-

|-

|-

|-

|-

|-

|-

|-

|-

1902 births
1981 deaths
People from the Province of Biella
Christian Democracy (Italy) politicians
Prime Ministers of Italy
Deputy Prime Ministers of Italy
Foreign ministers of Italy
Finance ministers of Italy
Members of the Constituent Assembly of Italy
Deputies of Legislature I of Italy
Deputies of Legislature II of Italy
Deputies of Legislature III of Italy
Deputies of Legislature IV of Italy
Senators of Legislature V of Italy
Senators of Legislature VI of Italy
Politicians of Piedmont
Presidents of the European Parliament
Christian Democracy (Italy) MEPs
Grand Crosses 1st class of the Order of Merit of the Federal Republic of Germany